Woolgoolga High School is a government-funded co-educational comprehensive secondary day school, located in , in the Mid North Coast region of New South Wales, Australia. 

Established in 1981 as Woolgoolga Central School, Woolgoolga High School enrolled approximately 810 students in 2020, from Year 7 to Year 12, of whom fourteen percent identified as Indigenous Australians and thirteen percent were from a language background other than English. The school is operated by the NSW Department of Education; the principal is Guy Wright.

Overview 

Elective subjects are offered to students in Years 8 to 12. Also offered are a wide variety of extension courses.

While the school does not have its own sporting facilities, it is within two hundred metres of Woolgoolga Sports Ground and Tennis Courts. The agricultural facilities are located off campus within the township of Woolgoolga.

Notable alumni 
* Cadel Evanscyclist; first Australian to win the Tour de France 
 Harley Inglebysurfer; world champion longboard rider
 Emma Moffatttriathlete; World Triathlon Champion and Australian Olympic Bronze Medallist

See also 

 List of government schools in New South Wales
 List of schools in Northern Rivers and Mid North Coast
 Education in Australia

References

External links 
 Woolgoolga High School website
 NSW Department of Education and Training: Woolgoolga High School

Educational institutions established in 1981
1981 establishments in Australia
Public high schools in New South Wales
Mid North Coast